George Lipsitz is an American Studies scholar and professor in the Department of Black Studies at the University of California, Santa Barbara, and the author of over half a dozen books, including The Possessive Investment in Whiteness. He is a leading scholar in social movements, urban culture, inequality, the politics of popular culture, and Whiteness Studies. In addition to The Possessive Investment in Whiteness, he has written Midnight at the Barrelhouse, Footsteps in the Dark, A Life in the Struggle, Time Passages, Dangerous Crossroads, American Studies in a Moment of Danger, Rainbow at Midnight, Sidewalks of St. Louis, Class & Culture in Cold War America and How Racism Takes Place.

Lipsitz serves as Chairman of the Board of Directors of the African American Policy Forum and is on the board of the National Fair Housing Alliance. He edits the Critical American Series for University of Minnesota Press, and co-edits the American Crossroads series for University of California Press. Lipsitz is Jewish.

See also
 Whiteness studies

References

External links

 Conversations with Scholars of American Popular Culture
 http://journals.cambridge.org/images/fileUpload/images/The_Bitter_But_Beautiful_Struggle.mp3

Year of birth missing (living people)
Living people
University of California, Santa Barbara faculty

White culture in North America
Critical race theory